Anna Nagar railway station is one of the two, now defunct, railway stations of the extended southern arm of the Chennai Central–Arakkonam section of the Chennai Suburban Railway Network, the other being Padi railway station. It served the neighbourhood of Anna Nagar, a suburb of Chennai. The station is located on Thirumangalam road, a road that connects Anna Nagar West with Villivakkam, near New Avadi Road, away from the commercial centre of the neighbourhood. The station is being maintained by the Integral Coach Factory (ICF), the premier production unit of the Indian railways.

History
In 2003, a 3.09 km-long railway line, initially used by the Integral Coach Factory (ICF) at Perambur for moving newly built coaches from shell to furnishing division of the factory, was strengthened at a cost of  72.9 million for operating passenger services. Two new stations, namely, Padi and Anna Nagar, were built and 13 existing bridges were renovated and the work was completed in five months. The railway station and the EMU services were inaugurated by the then Union Minister of State for Railways, A. K. Moorthy. Between 2003 and 2007, five suburban trains were being run from Anna Nagar to Chennai Beach via . In 2007, the service was discontinued due to construction of a rotary at the Padi junction replacing the level-crossing. Though the rotary was completed in 2009, services were not restored. However, in 2011, the railways planned to resume services in this section as a feeder service with six-car EMUs.

The tracks and land on which the station is built were originally owned by the ICF. When the Southern Railway intended to operate trains to Padi and Anna Nagar stations, the ICF handed over the land to the Southern Railway. When the train services were withdrawn in 2007, the ICF reclaimed the land from the zonal railway. The tracks and the stations are now used by the ICF for moving spare parts to the manufacturing unit and back. The lines will be used to test semi-high speed coaches running up to 160 km per hour.

Patronage
The service, however, had a low patronage. The average daily counter collection at the station was about  450, with just about 50 passengers. The monthly revenue never exceeded  15,000.

However, unlike the rest of the Chennai Suburban Railway network, there is only one line in this section. In addition, the traffic congestion    resulting due to closure of a gate near the Padi railway station limits the operation to five pairs of EMU services between Chennai Beach and Anna Nagar.

In a response to a public interest litigation filed in June 2013, the Railways announced that "the decision to discontinue operations at Anna Nagar station was made due to financial considerations. The per-day expense for operating train services between Villivakkam and Anna Nagar costs about 30,000, while the income was only a few hundreds."

See also

 Chennai Suburban Railway
 Railway stations in Chennai

References

Stations of Chennai Suburban Railway
Defunct railway stations in India
Railway stations in Chennai
Railway stations opened in 2003
Memorials to C. N. Annadurai
Railway stations closed in 2007